Crendonites is a genus of ammonites. Species are from the Upper Jurassic.

References

External links 

 Crendonites at bionames.org

Ammonite genera